Limone Piemonte (Vivaro-Alpine: Limon) is a comune (municipality) in the Province of Cuneo in the Italian region Piedmont, located about  south of Turin and about  south of Cuneo, on the border with France.

The train reached Limone in 1891 and made it to be a "ski-station", after in 1897 the skis arrived in Italy. In 1907 a competition began the official history of ski in Limone and in 2007 the town celebrated the "Century of skiing". Its fortune was permitted also by the presence of the Col de Tende Road Tunnel, which connected the town with many rich and famous locations, such as Montecarlo, Nice and Sanremo.
Limone Piemonte borders the following municipalities: Boves, Briga Alta, Chiusa di Pesio, Entracque, La Brigue (France), Peveragno, Tende (France), Vernante, Robilante, Roccavione, Borgo San Dalmazzo.

Ski resort 
Limone Piemonte is one of the oldest ski resorts in Italy. The Riserva Bianca (eng: White Reserve) consists in about 80 kilometres of trails, served by 1 gondola lift, 10 chairlifts, 3 ski lifts and 2 carpets: it connects three different ski areas (Limone-Sole, Tre Amis, Limonetto) while a forth one (Limone-Cros), too far from the other three, was abandoned in 1998. The resort hosted several editions of the FIS Alpine Ski World Cup and the FIS Snowboard World Cup. Before the beginning of the 2006 Winter Olympics its trails had been chosen as an alternative location for skiing and snowboarding training and competitions, in case of lack of snow in the Susa Valley, so they had been homologated to the standards and equipped with newer chairlifts.
Moreover, thanks to the presence of untouched fields and to the heavy winter snowfall of this section of the Alps, Limone is becoming more and more famous for off-piste skiing.

Demographic evolution

References

External links

 www.limonepiemonte.it